Dead Aim may refer to:

 Resident Evil: Dead Aim, a video game
 Dead Aim (novella), a 2013 crime/suspense novella by American author Joe R. Lansdale
 DeadAIM, a modification of AOL Instant Messenger